Blue Ridge Lake is a reservoir in Fannin County, in the northern portion of the U.S. state of Georgia. It is managed by the Tennessee Valley Authority and is primarily fed by the Toccoa River.

Blue Ridge Dam was completed in 1930. It stands 175 feet high and is 1,553 feet wide across the Toccoa river. The dam provides up to 13 megawatts of power via a single generator.

Drawdown 2010
As part of the Blue Ridge Dam Rehabilitation project, the Tennessee Valley Authority, began slowly lowering the elevation of Blue Ridge Lake in July 2010.  This rehabilitation project aimed to repair the dam penstock and to stabilize both the upstream and downstream faces of the dam.  The project reduced the water level in the lake to approximately 1630 feet above sea level around the middle of October 2010 and the portion of work requiring the drawdown was completed in April 2011 when refilling of the lake began.  However, TVA decided to hold the lake level at 1,672 feet through the summer of 2012 due to unexpected ground movement experienced in March 2012.

References

External links
Blue Ridge Reservoir — official TVA site
Operating Guide  —  for Lake Blue Ridge at the TVA site

Hiwassee River
Tennessee Valley Authority dams
Dams in Georgia (U.S. state)
Dams completed in 1930
Blue Ridge
Landforms of Fannin County, Georgia
Protected areas of Fannin County, Georgia